"What Am I to You?" is a song by American singer-songwriter Norah Jones. It was the second single from Feels Like Home. The song is written from the perspective of someone questioning whether or not their love for their partner is fully reciprocated.

Release and reception

Original recording
"What Am I to You?" was first released as a bonus track on the Japanese version of Come Away with Me in 2003. The song is relatively stripped-down;  drum brushes can be heard throughout, along with the guitar, bass, and Jones's vocals and electric piano.

Second version
The song was reworked before its inclusion on Feels Like Home. This version of the song is played at a slower tempo with a more full-band feel; the drums and particularly the electric guitar are more prominently featured, including a guitar solo instead of the electric piano solo on the original release. The song features The Band musicians Levon Helm on drums and Garth Hudson on the organ. It was released as the second single from Feels Like Home and reached #1 on the Billboard Adult Alternative Airplay chart.

Music video
The single version of the song received a music video which can be found on the DVD included with the Deluxe Edition release of Feels Like Home. The video consists of footage of Jones and her bandmates performing the song on stage, along with some candid backstage clips.

Chart positions

References

2004 singles
Norah Jones songs
Songs written by Norah Jones
2004 songs
Blue Note Records singles
American country music songs
American soft rock songs